The most muscular is a common bodybuilding pose, often used to highlight as much of a contestant's muscle repertoire as possible by demonstrating the maximum mass of muscle to the judging panel. A few variants including the crab, hands clasped, and hands on the waist are the most popular.

All front-facing muscles should be showcased since the contestant forces their hands together at the same time as contracting the pectorals, obliques, anterior deltoids, biceps, forearms and abdominals. The quadriceps and calves should also be flexed.

External links

Bodybuilding.com - Posing and Flexing

Bodybuilding